The year 1999 in radio involved some significant events.


Events
January 4 - KOZN/Kansas City dropped its modern AC format and began stunting with ocean waves. The following morning, KOZN flips to adult contemporary as "Star 102", and adopted the new call letters "KSRC."
January 5 - About an hour after KOZN debuted its new format, modern rocker KNRX/Kansas City dropped its 5-year-old format and begins stunting with a loop of Prince's "1999." The following afternoon, the station flips to urban oldies as "K107."
January - KHYS/Houston flips from Rhythmic CHR to rhythmic oldies
January - WPYO/Orlando signs on with a dance-leaning Rhythmic CHR format
February 27 - KMGR/Salt Lake City flips from adult standards to Rhythmic CHR as KUUU
March 15 - KRBV/Dallas-Fort Worth flips from Urban AC to Rhythmic CHR
March 26: Billionaire Paul Allen gives Portland, Oregon its first Rhythmic Contemporary station as KXL-FM becomes KXJM ("Jammin' 95.5").
April 5 - KHOT/Phoenix flips from Rhythmic Oldies to Regional Mexican
April 19 - WZJM/Cleveland drops its 14-year-old rhythmic-leaning Top 40/CHR format as "Jammin' 92.3" for rhythmic oldies (as "92.3 The Beat").
May 4 - Clear Channel Communications' official merger with Jacor is consummated.
May 13 - WXXM/Philadelphia flips from Modern AC "Max" to Rhythmic Oldies as WEJM, "Jammin' Gold"
May 14 - WENZ/Cleveland flips from modern rock to mainstream urban as "Kiss 107.9."
May 20 - WZLE/Lorain flips from Christian contemporary to Top 40/CHR as "KISS 104.9", targeting Greater Cleveland. WZLE owner Clear Channel subsequently filed a cease and desist order against WENZ claiming rights to the KISS-FM brand in Ohio; WENZ ultimately rebranded as "Z-107.9" on September 1.
May 21 - KVOD/Denver flips from classical to rhythmic oldies as "Jammin' 92.5."
May 22 - KESY/Omaha flips from Soft AC to Top 40/CHR as KQCH, "Channel 97.7."
May 24 - WJJJ/Pittsburgh flips from smooth jazz to rhythmic oldies as "104.7 The Beat."
June 4 - KGUM/Agana signs on with an active rock format, branded as "The Rock 105.1."
June 30 - WPLL/Miami flips from Modern AC to rhythmic oldies as "Mega 103.5."
July - Capstar and Chancellor officially complete their merger, with the newly combined company being renamed AMFM, Inc.
July 2 - WLCE/Buffalo flips from Modern AC to rhythmic oldies as WBUF, "B92.9."
August - KLAL/Little Rock evolves from Modern AC top Top 40/CHR
August 6 - WWXY and WWYX (now WPNA-FM)/Chicago flip to an 80's hits format, branded as "The 80s Channel."
August 28 - WAKS/Tampa flips formats from Top 40/CHR to hot AC as "Mix 100.7"; the station assumes the WMTX calls, while the WAKS calls are transferred to the former WZLE/Lorain.
September 1 - Corus Entertainment Is Created By Shaw Communications
September - CBS and Viacom announced a $37 billion merger
October 2 - 810 WHB/Kansas City flips to Sports Talk
October 4 - Clear Channel announces a nearly $23.5 billion merger with AMFM, creating America's largest radio group.  The deal would close the following year after selling off surplus in multiple markets.  This would be the largest broadcast deal in American history, a record that would stand until Clear Channel itself was bought out by private equity in 2007.
November 4 - WYXR (now WRFF)/Philadelphia flips from Hot AC to "Rock Adult Contemporary", branded as "Alice 104.5"
December 1 - WZBA flips from Country music to Rock AC as "100.7 The Bay"
December 17 - KYCW-FM/Seattle flips from Country to All-80s Hits

Debuts
October 23 – The BJ Shea Morning Experience makes its debut on KQBZ in Seattle, Washington.

Closings
April 17 – The Mutual Broadcasting System name was retired by owner Westwood One, with remaining affiliates switching to CNN Radio in a deal with Turner Broadcasting. On that same day, "NBC Radio"-branded newscasts (by this point, "Mutual" and "NBC" newscasts were produced and anchored by CBS Radio personnel) were also limited only to 5 a.m. – 10 a.m. on weekday mornings, with CNN Radio newscasts airing at all other times.

Deaths
 January 11 – Frank Parker, 95, American singer and television personality
 January 30 – Ed Herlihy, 89, American radio and television announcer for NBC 
 April 16 – Regis Cordic, 72, American radio personality and actor
 May 9 – Shirley Dinsdale, 72, American ventriloquist and television and radio personality of the 1940s and early 1950s
 December 15 – George Elrick, 95 Scottish bandleader and DJ
 Ted Mallie, 74, American radio and television announcer

References

See also
Radio broadcasting

 
Radio by year